The Men's synchronized 10 metre platform competition at the 2013 European Diving Championships was held on June 22 with a preliminary round and the final.

Results
The preliminary round was held at 12:00 and the final was held at 17:00.

Green denotes finalists

References

2013 European Diving Championships